Rajesh Kumar Agrawal (born 5 May 1953) is the current President of the National Consumer Disputes Redressal Commission (NCDRC) and a former judge of the Supreme Court of India. 

He retired from the Supreme Court on 4 May 2018 and was appointed the President of the NCDRC on 1 July 2018. He served as the Chief Justice of the Madras High Court from 24 October 2013 till his elevation to the Supreme Court on 17 February 2014, having assumed the role of acting Chief Justice of the Madras High Court after his predecessor, M. Y. Eqbal, became a judge of the Supreme Court on 7 February 2013.

Agrawal started practicing law in 1976, having joined the chambers of his father Raja Ram Agrawal, a Senior Advocate and former Advocate General for the State of Uttar Pradesh. He was elevated as a permanent judge of the Allahabad High Court on 5 February 1999, where he served until his transfer to the Madras High Court as the acting Chief Justice on 6 February 2013.

References 

Living people
1953 births
Chief Justices of the Madras High Court
Justices of the Supreme Court of India
20th-century Indian judges
21st-century Indian judges
University of Allahabad alumni